Nine Lives is the ninth studio album by hard rock band Last Autumn's Dream released by Marquee Avalon in Japan on December 14, 2011 and was scheduled to be released in Europe on January 20, 2012.

Track listing
 In A Perfect World
 Nine Lives
 Is This Just Another Heartache
 Merry-Go-Round
 Golden Cage
 All I Can Think Of
 Megalomania
 The Last To Know
 Angel Eyes
 We Never Said Goodbye
 Waited A Long Time (Bonus Track)
 Don't Let Love Fade Away

Additional information
In this recording were included  The Last to know with Jeff Scott Soto and Angel Eyes, a duet with Jenny Redenkvist and Waited A Long Time as Bonus Track.

Personnel
 Mikael Erlandsson - lead vocals and keyboards
 Andy Malecek - guitar
 Nalley Pahlsson − bass
 Jamie Borger − drums

Guest Musicians
 Jeff Scott Soto
 Jenny Redenkvist

References 
LAD bio and Released info in Japan
Spanish review made by Sergio Fernández

External links 
 LAD Myspace Page
 LAD Facebook official fan page
 Marcel Jacob's official site
 Jamie Borger official website

Last Autumn's Dream albums
2011 albums